Yeung Kai-yin, GBS, CBE, JP(6 January 1941 - 8 February 2007) is a Chinese civil servant and businessman in Hong Kong.

Career 
In 1962, Yeung joined the Hong Kong Government as an Administrative Officer. In 1989, Yeung became the Secretary for Education and Manpower, until 1991. Yeung was also the Secretary for Transport.

In 1991, Yeung became the Secretary for the Treasury in Hong Kong. In 1993, at age 52, Yeung resigned as Secretary for the Treasury in Hong Kong.

In 1993, Yeung became an executive director of Sino Land, a major property developer of Hong Kong and a subsidiary of Tsim Sha Tsui Properties.

In 1996, Yeung served as chairman and chief executive of Kowloon-Canton Railway Corporation (KCRC). During his tenure, the KCRC constructed the West Rail line that links northwestern New Territories (Tuen Mun, Tin Shui Wai and Yuen Long) with Kowloon. Yeung's appointment of fellow retired civil servants in KCRC and conciliatory attitude to the government drew public criticism and brought him into direct conflict with Michael Tien. the subsequent chairman. Yeung's hostile attitude on environmentalist opposition against the use of Long Valley wetland area for the development of Lok Ma Chau Spur Line and misuse of public fund in the Siemens fiasco eventually led to his downfall in 2001. 

In 1998, Yeung was appointed as Chairman of the Vocational Training Council in Hong Kong.

Awards 
 1993 Order of the British Empire (CBE) 
 2005 Gold Bauhinia Star (GBS).

Personal life 
On 8 February 2007, Yeung died of legionnaire's disease in Hong Kong. Yeung was cremated at Cape Collision.

See also 
 Michael Tien

References

External links 
 Yeung Kai-yin at webb-site.com
 Yeung Kai-yin at info.gov.hk

1941 births
2007 deaths
Government officials of Hong Kong
Hong Kong chief executives
Commanders of the Order of the British Empire
People from Zhongshan
Alumni of the University of Hong Kong
Kowloon–Canton Railway
HK LegCo Members 1985–1988
HK LegCo Members 1988–1991
Members of the Selection Committee of Hong Kong